Anthony Lawrence DeLuca (November 16, 1960 – April 16, 1999) was a former nose tackle in the National Football League. He was a member of the Green Bay Packers during the 1984 NFL season.

References

1960 births
1999 deaths
American football defensive tackles
American people of Italian descent
Green Bay Packers players
Players of American football from Connecticut
Rhode Island Rams football players
Sportspeople from Greenwich, Connecticut